Salačova Lhota is a municipality and village in Pelhřimov District in the Vysočina Region of the Czech Republic. It has about 100 inhabitants.

Administrative parts
Villages of Malá Černá and Velká Černá are administrative parts of Salačova Lhota.

Gallery

References

Villages in Pelhřimov District